Michail Elgin and Alexandre Kudryavtsev won the first edition of the tournament. They defeated Harri Heliövaara and Jose Rubin Statham 6–3, 6–2 in the final.

Seeds

Draw

Draw

External links
 Main Draw

Green World ATP Challenger - Doubles
2011 Doubles
2011 in Chinese tennis